Stein Schjærven (7 October 1934 – 21 November 2012) was a Norwegian marketing agent.

He was born in Oslo. He started his marketing career in Alfsen & Becker in 1958, and ran the agency Schjærven Reklamebyrå from 1962 to his retirement in 2004; a seminal agency in Norwegian marketing. He was awarded the prize Gullblyanten in 1973.

His son Ståle and daughter Sivje took over the agency from 2001.

References

1934 births
2012 deaths
Businesspeople from Oslo
Norwegian marketing people